Riverview Junior-Senior High School is a six-year junior and senior high school located in Oakmont, Pennsylvania.  The school has approximately 430 students and serves Oakmont, Pennsylvania and Verona, Pennsylvania.

Academics
Riverview Junior-Senior High School currently employs approximately 60 teachers, including Principal Eric Hewitt, among four core subjects (Mathematics, English, social studies, and the sciences), foreign languages Spanish and French, as well as special education staff and tutors.

Athletics
Currently, Riverview Junior-Senior High School has over 15 sports teams for fall, winter, and spring sports.

Fall Sports
  Golf
  Boys Cross-Country
  Girls Cross-Country
  Football
  Boys Soccer
  Girls Soccer
  Cheerleading
  Girls Tennis
 Girls Volleyball

Winter Sports
  Boys Basketball
  Girls Basketball
  Wrestling

Spring Sports
  Baseball
  Softball
  Boys Track & Field
  Girls Track & Field
  Boys Tennis

Clubs
Riverview Junior-Senior High School has 16 clubs that integrate with a multitude of electives and courses.
  Model United Nations
  Art Club
  Builder's Club
  Chorus
  Dance Club
  Drama Club
  Ecology Club
  French Club
  Graphics and Design Club
  Junior/Senior Class
  Key Club
  National Honor Society
  Raidervision
  REAP
  SADD
  Ski Club
  Spanish Club
  Student Council
 Musical

Notable alumni
 Tim Kaiser - Television producer

References

Public high schools in Pennsylvania
Schools in Allegheny County, Pennsylvania
Public middle schools in Pennsylvania